The Dome may refer to:

Places:
In the UK:
The Dome, Edinburgh, an 1847 built Graeco-Roman style building in Edinburgh's New Town, Scotland
The Dome Leisure Centre, an arena and leisure centre in Doncaster, England
Brighton Dome, an 1805 built arts venue housing three venues Brighton, England
Dome of Discovery, a building of the 1951 Festival of Britain, demolished on closure
Millennium Dome, a former Millennium exhibition venue in London, England, now redeveloped as The O2 entertainment venue
Plymouth Dome
In the US:
The Dome (Anchorage, Alaska), multi-purpose sports arena in Anchorage, Alaska
The Dome Center incorporating the Dome Arena, a fair and convention complex in Henrietta, New York
Carrier Dome, a stadium owned by Syracuse University, Syracuse, New York
Louisiana Superdome, home of the New Orleans Saints American football team
Hubert H. Humphrey Metrodome, home of the Minnesota Vikings American football team
The Dome at America's Center, former home of the St. Louis Rams
In the Marshall Islands:
Runit Dome, a 46 cm thick Concrete Dome over 73,000 cubic meters of radioactive debris
Other places:
The Dome (Dubai), a 44 floor skyscraper in Jumeirah Lake Towers, Dubai, UAE
The Dome (Sydney), an indoor sports arena in the Sydney Olympic Park, Australia
The Dome (Swakopmund), an indoor sports arena in Swakopmund, Namibia

Other uses:
The Dome (periodical), a British arts periodical published from 1897 to 1900
The Dome (TV program), a German television program and music event

See also
 Dome (disambiguation)
 Under the Dome (disambiguation)